The 1973 Philadelphia Phillies season was the 91st season in the history of the franchise. The team, managed by Danny Ozark, played their third season at Veterans Stadium and finished last in the National League East, 11 games behind the Mets.

Offseason 
 October 31, 1972: Don Money, John Vukovich, and Bill Champion were traded by the Phillies to the Milwaukee Brewers for Jim Lonborg, Ken Brett, Ken Sanders, and Earl Stephenson.
 November 30, 1972: Oscar Gamble and Roger Freed were traded by the Phillies to the Cleveland Indians for Del Unser and Terry Wedgewood (minors).
 November 30, 1972: Joe Lis, Ken Sanders and Ken Reynolds were traded by the Phillies to the Minnesota Twins for César Tovar.
 January 10, 1973: Rick Bosetti was drafted by the Phillies in the 7th round of the 1973 Major League Baseball draft. Player signed January 17, 1973.

Regular season 
Steve Carlton, the highest paid pitcher in the game at $165,000, never recovered from a spring training illness and went 13–20. Pitchers Jim Lonborg and Ken Brett, both obtained in a trade with the Milwaukee Brewers, won 13 games each, as did Wayne Twitchell, whose 2.50 ERA was third in the league. Left fielder Greg Luzinski led the team with 29 home runs, 97 RBIs, and 76 runs, and hit .285. In his rookie season, Mike Schmidt hit just .196 and struck out 136 times in 367 at-bats.

Season standings

Record vs. opponents

Notable transactions 
 June 5, 1973: 1973 Major League Baseball draft
Todd Cruz was drafted by the Phillies in the 2nd round. Player signed June 18, 1973.
Dan Boitano was drafted by the Phillies in the 1st round (11th pick) of the secondary phase. Player signed June 19, 1973.
 September 11, 1973: Willie Hernández was signed as an amateur free agent by the Phillies.

Game log

|- style="background:#fbb"
| 1 || April 6 || @ Mets || 0–3 || Tom Seaver (1–0) || Steve Carlton (0–1) || Tug McGraw (1) || 27,326 || 0–1
|- style="background:#fbb"
| 2 || April 7 || @ Mets || 2–3 || Jon Matlack (1–0) || Dick Selma (0–1) || None || 18,738 || 0–2
|- style="background:#bbb"
| – || April 8 || @ Mets || colspan=6 | Postponed (rain); Makeup: June 27 as a traditional double-header
|- style="background:#bfb"
| 3 || April 10 || Expos || 7–5 || Steve Carlton (1–1) || Mike Torrez (0–2) || None || 40,809 || 1–2
|- style="background:#fbb"
| 4 || April 12 || Expos || 3–5 || Balor Moore (1–0) || Jim Lonborg (0–1) || Mike Marshall (1) || 5,130 || 1–3
|- style="background:#bfb"
| 5 || April 13 || Mets || 7–1 || Larry Christenson (1–0) || Jon Matlack (1–1) || None || 7,127 || 2–3
|- style="background:#bfb"
| 6 || April 14 || Mets || 7–3 || Steve Carlton (2–1) || Jim McAndrew (0–1) || None || 11,063 || 3–3
|- style="background:#fbb"
| 7 || April 15 || Mets || 1–2 || Harry Parker (1–0) || Jim Lonborg (0–2) || Tug McGraw (2) || 30,718 || 3–4
|- style="background:#bfb"
| 8 || April 17 || @ Expos || 9–6 || Dick Selma (1–1) || Mike Marshall (0–2) || Bill Wilson (1) || 7,831 || 4–4
|- style="background:#fbb"
| 9 || April 18 || @ Expos || 1–2 || Steve Renko (1–0) || Steve Carlton (2–2) || None || 13,728 || 4–5
|- style="background:#fbb"
| 10 || April 19 || @ Expos || 5–6 || Mike Torrez (1–3) || Larry Christenson (1–1) || Tom Walker (1) || 12,359 || 4–6
|- style="background:#bfb"
| 11 || April 21 || Cardinals || 7–4 || Jim Lonborg (1–2) || Scipio Spinks (0–3) || Mac Scarce (1) || 8,031 || 5–6
|- style="background:#bfb"
| 12 || April 22 (1) || Cardinals || 4–2 || Steve Carlton (3–2) || Reggie Cleveland (0–2) || None || see 2nd game || 6–6
|- style="background:#bfb"
| 13 || April 22 (2) || Cardinals || 2–1 || Bill Wilson (1–0) || Bob Gibson (0–2) || None || 18,042 || 7–6
|- style="background:#fbb"
| 14 || April 24 || @ Braves || 2–11 || Carl Morton (1–1) || Larry Christenson (1–2) || Ron Schueler (1) || 3,405 || 7–7
|- style="background:#fbb"
| 15 || April 25 || @ Braves || 2–5 || Gary Gentry (2–2) || Jim Lonborg (1–3) || Phil Niekro (1) || 2,866 || 7–8
|- style="background:#bfb"
| 16 || April 27 || @ Reds || 3–1 || Steve Carlton (4–2) || Ross Grimsley (3–1) || None || 13,690 || 8–8
|- style="background:#bfb"
| 17 || April 28 || @ Reds || 1–0 || Dick Ruthven (1–0) || Don Gullett (3–2) || Mac Scarce (2) || 14,126 || 9–8
|- style="background:#fbb"
| 18 || April 29 || @ Reds || 0–8 || Jack Billingham (4–0) || Larry Christenson (1–3) || None || 39,191 || 9–9
|-

|- style="background:#fbb"
| 19 || May 1 || Astros || 0–3 || Jerry Reuss (4–1) || Steve Carlton (4–3) || None || 10,333 || 9–10
|- style="background:#fbb"
| 20 || May 2 || Astros || 4–9 || Dave Roberts (2–1) || Jim Lonborg (1–4) || Jim Ray (2) || 8,101 || 9–11
|- style="background:#bfb"
| 21 || May 4 || Braves || 5–4 (20) || Jim Lonborg (2–4) || Tom Kelley (0–1) || None || 10,158 || 10–11
|- style="background:#fbb"
| 22 || May 5 || Braves || 0–7 || Carl Morton (2–2) || Steve Carlton (4–4) || None || 11,368 || 10–12
|- style="background:#fbb"
| 23 || May 6 || Braves || 1–3 || Gary Gentry (3–2) || Mac Scarce (0–1) || None || 60,120 || 10–13
|- style="background:#bfb"
| 24 || May 7 || Reds || 3–2 (14) || Barry Lersch (1–0) || Pedro Borbón (0–2) || None || 7,886 || 11–13
|- style="background:#fbb"
| 25 || May 8 || Reds || 1–7 || Jack Billingham (5–1) || Dick Ruthven (1–1) || None || 6,196 || 11–14
|- style="background:#fbb"
| 26 || May 9 || Reds || 7–9 || Tom Hall (3–1) || Barry Lersch (1–1) || None || 11,992 || 11–15
|- style="background:#fbb"
| 27 || May 11 || @ Cubs || 3–4 || Bob Locker (4–1) || Ken Brett (0–1) || Jack Aker (6) || 5,514 || 11–16
|- style="background:#fbb"
| 28 || May 12 || @ Cubs || 1–3 || Rick Reuschel (3–2) || Wayne Twitchell (0–1) || None || 15,095 || 11–17
|- style="background:#fbb"
| 29 || May 13 (1) || @ Cubs || 2–4 || Ferguson Jenkins (3–3) || Steve Carlton (4–5) || None || see 2nd game || 11–18
|- style="background:#fbb"
| 30 || May 13 (2) || @ Cubs || 3–9 || Bill Bonham (2–0) || Dick Ruthven (1–2) || None || 19,242 || 11–19
|- style="background:#bfb"
| 31 || May 14 || @ Cardinals || 10–5 || Ken Brett (1–1) || Reggie Cleveland (2–4) || Mac Scarce (3) || 7,677 || 12–19
|- style="background:#fbb"
| 32 || May 15 || @ Cardinals || 4–8 || Rick Wise (4–2) || Bucky Brandon (0–1) || None || 7,368 || 12–20
|- style="background:#bfb"
| 33 || May 16 || @ Pirates || 5–2 || Wayne Twitchell (1–1) || Dock Ellis (3–4) || Mac Scarce (4) || 6,885 || 13–20
|- style="background:#fbb"
| 34 || May 17 || @ Pirates || 2–5 || Bob Moose (3–3) || Steve Carlton (4–6) || Jim Rooker (4) || 6,885 || 13–21
|- style="background:#fbb"
| 35 || May 18 || Cubs || 2–9 || Ferguson Jenkins (4–3) || Dick Ruthven (1–3) || None || 10,067 || 13–22
|- style="background:#bfb"
| 36 || May 19 (1) || Cubs || 3–0 || Ken Brett (2–1) || Burt Hooton (5–3) || None || see 2nd game || 14–22
|- style="background:#fbb"
| 37 || May 19 (2) || Cubs || 6–7 || Bob Locker (5–1) || Jim Lonborg (2–5) || Jack Aker (8) || 27,569 || 14–23
|- style="background:#bbb"
| – || May 20 || Cubs || colspan=6 | Postponed (rain); Makeup: July 31 as a traditional double-header
|- style="background:#fbb"
| 38 || May 21 || Pirates || 4–5 || Steve Blass (2–2) || Mac Scarce (0–2) || Dave Giusti (3) || 9,010 || 14–24
|- style="background:#bfb"
| 39 || May 22 || Pirates || 7–4 || Wayne Twitchell (2–1) || Dock Ellis (3–5) || None || 11,617 || 15–24
|- style="background:#bbb"
| – || May 23 || Pirates || colspan=6 | Postponed (rain); Makeup: August 4 as a traditional double-header
|- style="background:#bfb"
| 40 || May 25 || @ Padres || 8–1 || Ken Brett (3–1) || Fred Norman (1–6) || None || 26,615 || 16–24
|- style="background:#bfb"
| 41 || May 26 || @ Padres || 4–0 || Steve Carlton (5–6) || Mike Caldwell (2–6) || None || 7,260 || 17–24
|- style="background:#bfb"
| 42 || May 27 (1) || @ Padres || 4–3 || Wayne Twitchell (3–1) || Bill Greif (3–5) || Barry Lersch (1) || see 2nd game || 18–24
|- style="background:#bfb"
| 43 || May 27 (2) || @ Padres || 6–4 || Jim Lonborg (3–5) || Steve Arlin (2–2) || Mac Scarce (5) || 9,983 || 19–24
|- style="background:#fbb"
| 44 || May 28 || @ Dodgers || 1–5 || Andy Messersmith (5–4) || Dick Ruthven (1–4) || None || 15,300 || 19–25
|- style="background:#fbb"
| 45 || May 29 || @ Dodgers || 3–9 || Tommy John (4–2) || Ken Brett (3–2) || Jim Brewer (5) || 12,350 || 19–26
|- style="background:#fbb"
| 46 || May 30 || @ Dodgers || 4–9 || Claude Osteen (5–3) || Steve Carlton (5–7) || None || 15,462 || 19–27
|-

|- style="background:#fbb"
| 47 || June 1 || @ Giants || 1–2 || Ron Bryant (8–3) || Wayne Twitchell (3–2) || None || 5,359 || 19–28
|- style="background:#fbb"
| 48 || June 2 || @ Giants || 7–11 || Charlie Williams (1–0) || Jim Lonborg (3–6) || Elías Sosa (3) || 5,949 || 19–29
|- style="background:#fbb"
| 49 || June 3 || @ Giants || 4–5 || Charlie Williams (2–0) || Bill Wilson (1–1) || None || 15,483 || 19–30
|- style="background:#fbb"
| 50 || June 4 || @ Astros || 0–7 || Dave Roberts (6–3) || Larry Christenson (1–4) || None || 13,291 || 19–31
|- style="background:#bfb"
| 51 || June 5 || @ Astros || 4–0 || Wayne Twitchell (4–2) || Jerry Reuss (6–4) || None || 12,912 || 20–31
|- style="background:#fbb"
| 52 || June 6 || @ Astros || 3–4 (10) || Jim Crawford (2–2) || Barry Lersch (1–2) || None || 13,081 || 20–32
|- style="background:#bfb"
| 53 || June 8 || Padres || 5–1 || Steve Carlton (6–7) || Steve Arlin (2–3) || None || 18,096 || 21–32
|- style="background:#bfb"
| 54 || June 9 || Padres || 4–1 || Ken Brett (4–2) || Bill Greif (4–7) || Bill Wilson (2) || 15,226 || 22–32
|- style="background:#bfb"
| 55 || June 10 || Padres || 11–0 || Wayne Twitchell (5–2) || Clay Kirby (2–7) || None || 27,863 || 23–32
|- style="background:#fbb"
| 56 || June 11 || Dodgers || 3–5 || Don Sutton (8–4) || Dick Ruthven (1–5) || Pete Richert (6) || 10,635 || 23–33
|- style="background:#fbb"
| 57 || June 12 || Dodgers || 6–8 || Doug Rau (1–1) || Mac Scarce (0–3) || Jim Brewer (6) || 16,218 || 23–34
|- style="background:#bfb"
| 58 || June 13 || Dodgers || 16–3 || Ken Brett (5–2) || Tommy John (5–3) || None || 13,068 || 24–34
|- style="background:#fbb"
| 59 || June 15 || Giants || 3–4 (10) || Ron Bryant (11–3) || Bill Wilson (1–2) || Elías Sosa (4) || 23,585 || 24–35
|- style="background:#bfb"
| 60 || June 16 || Giants || 5–4 || Barry Lersch (2–2) || Jim Barr (4–7) || None || 25,615 || 25–35
|- style="background:#bfb"
| 61 || June 17 || Giants || 11–7 || Steve Carlton (7–7) || Tom Bradley (5–5) || Bill Wilson (3) || 25,299 || 26–35
|- style="background:#bfb"
| 62 || June 18 || Mets || 9–6 || Ken Brett (6–2) || Jim McAndrew (3–5) || None || 13,190 || 27–35
|- style="background:#bfb"
| 63 || June 19 || Mets || 6–1 || Jim Lonborg (4–6) || Harry Parker (5–1) || Mac Scarce (6) || 17,481 || 28–35
|- style="background:#bfb"
| 64 || June 20 || Mets || 4–3 || Wayne Twitchell (6–2) || Jon Matlack (4–9) || None || 24,302 || 29–35
|- style="background:#fbb"
| 65 || June 22 || @ Expos || 2–4 || Mike Torrez (4–5) || Steve Carlton (7–8) || None || 11,707 || 29–36
|- style="background:#bfb"
| 66 || June 23 || @ Expos || 7–2 || Ken Brett (7–2) || Balor Moore (4–7) || None || 18,385 || 30–36
|- style="background:#bfb"
| 67 || June 24 || @ Expos || 5–4 || Jim Lonborg (5–6) || Steve Renko (6–4) || Bill Wilson (4) || 17,776 || 31–36
|- style="background:#bfb"
| 68 || June 25 || Cardinals || 7–6 || Bucky Brandon (1–1) || Diego Seguí (3–3) || Mac Scarce (7) || 16,570 || 32–36
|- style="background:#bfb"
| 69 || June 26 (1) || Cardinals || 10–3 || Dick Ruthven (2–5) || Bob Gibson (7–7) || Mac Scarce (8) || see 2nd game || 33–36
|- style="background:#fbb"
| 70 || June 26 (2) || Cardinals || 4–5 (11) || Wayne Granger (2–2) || Bucky Brandon (1–2) || Orlando Peña (2) || 40,492 || 33–37
|- style="background:#fbb"
| 71 || June 27 (1) || @ Mets || 6–7 || George Stone (4–2) || Barry Lersch (2–3) || Buzz Capra (1) || see 2nd game || 33–38
|- style="background:#bfb"
| 72 || June 27 (2) || @ Mets || 7–1 || Mike Wallace (1–0) || Harry Parker (5–2) || None || 31,095 || 34–38
|- style="background:#bfb"
| 73 || June 28 || @ Mets || 11–4 || Jim Lonborg (6–6) || Jim McAndrew (3–6) || None || 9,965 || 35–38
|- style="background:#fbb"
| 74 || June 29 || @ Cardinals || 1–2 (10) || Orlando Peña (2–1) || Mac Scarce (0–4) || None || 13,743 || 35–39
|- style="background:#fbb"
| 75 || June 30 || @ Cardinals || 8–9 || Alan Foster (5–5) || Steve Carlton (7–9) || Diego Seguí (10) || 45,869 || 35–40
|-

|- style="background:#bfb"
| 76 || July 1 || @ Cardinals || 1–0 || Dick Ruthven (3–5) || Bob Gibson (7–8) || None || 15,477 || 36–40
|- style="background:#fbb"
| 77 || July 2 || @ Cardinals || 4–7 || Reggie Cleveland (9–5) || Mike Wallace (1–1) || Orlando Peña (3) || 13,096 || 36–41
|- style="background:#bfb"
| 78 || July 3 || @ Cubs || 8–2 || Jim Lonborg (7–6) || Milt Pappas (5–6) || None || 18,849 || 37–41
|- style="background:#fbb"
| 79 || July 4 || @ Cubs || 2–3 (10) || Jack Aker (4–5) || Bill Wilson (1–3) || None || 22,141 || 37–42
|- style="background:#bfb"
| 80 || July 5 || @ Cubs || 7–4 || Steve Carlton (8–9) || Rick Reuschel (9–5) || None || 24,849 || 38–42
|- style="background:#fbb"
| 81 || July 6 || Reds || 2–8 || Fred Norman (6–8) || Dick Ruthven (3–6) || None || 58,294 || 38–43
|- style="background:#fbb"
| 82 || July 7 || Reds || 4–5 || Jim McGlothlin (3–2) || Jim Lonborg (7–7) || Don Gullett (1) || 31,250 || 38–44
|- style="background:#fbb"
| 83 || July 8 || Reds || 0–4 || Jack Billingham (12–5) || Wayne Twitchell (6–3) || None || 36,165 || 38–45
|- style="background:#fbb"
| 84 || July 9 || Braves || 3–6 (10) || Tom House (1–1) || Barry Lersch (2–4) || Joe Hoerner (2) || 18,804 || 38–46
|- style="background:#fbb"
| 85 || July 10 || Braves || 2–4 || Roric Harrison (5–2) || Dick Ruthven (3–7) || Adrian Devine (2) || 22,297 || 38–47
|- style="background:#bfb"
| 86 || July 11 || Braves || 6–5 || Ken Brett (8–2) || Jimmy Freeman (0–2) || None || 18,117 || 39–47
|- style="background:#fbb"
| 87 || July 12 || Astros || 6–7 || Juan Pizarro (1–1) || Barry Lersch (2–5) || None || 13,110 || 39–48
|- style="background:#bfb"
| 88 || July 13 || Astros || 5–3 || Wayne Twitchell (7–3) || Don Wilson (6–10) || None || 19,087 || 40–48
|- style="background:#bfb"
| 89 || July 14 || Astros || 7–0 || Steve Carlton (9–9) || Jerry Reuss (11–7) || None || 25,062 || 41–48
|- style="background:#fbb"
| 90 || July 15 || Astros || 0–2 (6) || Dave Roberts (9–7) || Dick Ruthven (3–8) || None || 20,648 || 41–49
|- style="background:#fbb"
| 91 || July 16 || @ Reds || 0–1 || Fred Norman (7–9) || Ken Brett (8–3) || None || 16,457 || 41–50
|- style="background:#bfb"
| 92 || July 17 || @ Reds || 2–1 || Jim Lonborg (8–7) || Jack Billingham (13–6) || None || 19,549 || 42–50
|- style="background:#fbb"
| 93 || July 18 || @ Reds || 3–7 || Tom Hall (6–4) || Steve Carlton (9–10) || Clay Carroll (7) || 17,429 || 42–51
|- style="background:#bfb"
| 94 || July 20 || @ Braves || 6–4 || Wayne Twitchell (8–3) || Phil Niekro (9–5) || Dick Ruthven (1) || 9,231 || 43–51
|- style="background:#bfb"
| 95 || July 21 || @ Braves || 8–4 || Ken Brett (9–3) || Ron Schueler (5–5) || Bucky Brandon (1) || 16,236 || 44–51
|- style="background:#bfb"
| 96 || July 22 (1) || @ Braves || 6–5 || Dick Ruthven (4–8) || Max León (0–1) || None || see 2nd game || 45–51
|- style="background:#bfb"
| 97 || July 22 (2) || @ Braves || 5–1 || Jim Lonborg (9–7) || Carl Morton (8–7) || Bucky Brandon (2) || 18,788 || 46–51
|- style="background:#bbcaff;"
| – || July 24 ||colspan="7" |1973 Major League Baseball All-Star Game at Royals Stadium in Kansas City
|- style="background:#fbb"
| 98 || July 26 (1) || Expos || 0–4 || Steve Rogers (1–0) || Steve Carlton (9–11) || None || see 2nd game || 46–52
|- style="background:#fbb"
| 99 || July 26 (2) || Expos || 1–5 || Steve Renko (10–6) || Ken Brett (9–4) || Mike Marshall (19) || 34,459 || 46–53
|- style="background:#fbb"
| 100 || July 27 || Expos || 4–5 || Tom Walker (4–4) || Bucky Brandon (1–3) || Mike Marshall (20) || 18,254 || 46–54
|- style="background:#bfb"
| 101 || July 28 || @ Pirates || 5–0 || Wayne Twitchell (9–3) || Jim Rooker (4–3) || None || 14,630 || 47–54
|- style="background:#fbb"
| 102 || July 29 (1) || @ Pirates || 2–5 || Ramón Hernández (3–2) || Dick Ruthven (4–9) || None || see 2nd game || 47–55
|- style="background:#fbb"
| 103 || July 29 (2) || @ Pirates || 2–5 || Luke Walker (7–8) || Barry Lersch (2–6) || Dave Giusti (13) || 26,947 || 47–56
|- style="background:#bfb"
| 104 || July 30 || @ Pirates || 1–0 || Steve Carlton (10–11) || Bob Moose (6–10) || None || 17,220 || 48–56
|- style="background:#fbb"
| 105 || July 31 (1) || Cubs || 3–4 || Ferguson Jenkins (10–9) || Jim Lonborg (9–8) || Bob Locker (10) || see 2nd game || 48–57
|- style="background:#bfb"
| 106 || July 31 (2) || Cubs || 6–5 || Ken Brett (10–4) || Milt Pappas (5–10) || None || 37,003 || 49–57
|-

|- style="background:#bfb"
| 107 || August 1 || Cubs || 2–0 || Wayne Twitchell (10–3) || Burt Hooton (9–9) || None || 23,381 || 50–57
|- style="background:#bfb"
| 108 || August 2 || Cubs || 4–1 || Dick Ruthven (5–9) || Bill Bonham (4–2) || None || 16,855 || 51–57
|- style="background:#fbb"
| 109 || August 3 || Pirates || 1–3 || John Morlan (1–0) || Steve Carlton (10–12) || Ramón Hernández (5) || 24,152 || 51–58
|- style="background:#bfb"
| 110 || August 4 (1) || Pirates || 11–5 || Ken Brett (11–4) || Luke Walker (7–9) || None || see 2nd game || 52–58
|- style="background:#fbb"
| 111 || August 4 (2) || Pirates || 4–11 || Ramón Hernández (4–2) || Jim Lonborg (9–9) || None || 48,294 || 52–59
|- style="background:#fbb"
| 112 || August 5 || Pirates || 1–4 || Dock Ellis (11–9) || Wayne Twitchell (10–4) || Dave Giusti (14) || 31,157 || 52–60
|- style="background:#fbb"
| 113 || August 8 || @ Padres || 0–3 || Bill Greif (7–12) || Steve Carlton (10–13) || None || 2,696 || 52–61
|- style="background:#fbb"
| 114 || August 9 || @ Padres || 9–10 (11) || Mike Corkins (4–7) || Bucky Brandon (1–4) || None || 4,791 || 52–62
|- style="background:#bfb"
| 115 || August 10 || @ Dodgers || 5–3 || Wayne Twitchell (11–4) || Tommy John (11–7) || None || 21,167 || 53–62
|- style="background:#bfb"
| 116 || August 11 || @ Dodgers || 3–1 || Ken Brett (12–4) || Al Downing (9–7) || None || 50,557 || 54–62
|- style="background:#fbb"
| 117 || August 12 || @ Dodgers || 1–2 || Jim Brewer (5–4) || Steve Carlton (10–14) || None || 22,281 || 54–63
|- style="background:#bfb"
| 118 || August 14 || @ Giants || 4–3 || Jim Lonborg (10–9) || Jim Barr (9–12) || None || 4,128 || 55–63
|- style="background:#fbb"
| 119 || August 15 || @ Giants || 2–11 || Juan Marichal (10–8) || Wayne Twitchell (11–5) || None || 4,089 || 55–64
|- style="background:#fbb"
| 120 || August 16 || @ Giants || 1–2 || Tom Bradley (10–11) || Ken Brett (12–5) || Elías Sosa (11) || 4,519 || 55–65
|- style="background:#bfb"
| 121 || August 17 || @ Astros || 8–3 || Steve Carlton (11–14) || Don Wilson (9–13) || None || 20,690 || 56–65
|- style="background:#fbb"
| 122 || August 18 || @ Astros || 2–3 || Jim Ray (6–1) || Jim Lonborg (10–10) || Ken Forsch (3) || 23,047 || 56–66
|- style="background:#bfb"
| 123 || August 19 || @ Astros || 5–3 || Wayne Twitchell (12–5) || Jerry Reuss (13–9) || None || 17,202 || 57–66
|- style="background:#bfb"
| 124 || August 21 || Padres || 9–8 || George Culver (5–4) || Mike Caldwell (5–14) || None || 13,108 || 58–66
|- style="background:#fbb"
| 125 || August 22 || Padres || 3–8 || Steve Arlin (9–11) || Steve Carlton (11–15) || None || 16,131 || 58–67
|- style="background:#bfb"
| 126 || August 23 || Padres || 6–3 || Jim Lonborg (11–10) || Clay Kirby (7–14) || None || 10,601 || 59–67
|- style="background:#fbb"
| 127 || August 24 || Dodgers || 0–3 || Tommy John (12–7) || Wayne Twitchell (12–6) || None || 30,671 || 59–68
|- style="background:#fbb"
| 128 || August 25 || Dodgers || 4–6 (12) || Pete Richert (3–1) || Mac Scarce (0–5) || Doug Rau (2) || 44,116 || 59–69
|- style="background:#fbb"
| 129 || August 26 || Dodgers || 3–7 || Don Sutton (16–8) || Steve Carlton (11–16) || Charlie Hough (2) || 31,045 || 59–70
|- style="background:#bfb"
| 130 || August 27 || Giants || 7–4 || Jim Lonborg (12–10) || Jim Barr (10–14) || Mac Scarce (9) || 17,027 || 60–70
|- style="background:#bfb"
| 131 || August 28 || Giants || 1–0 || Wayne Twitchell (13–6) || Juan Marichal (10–11) || None || 20,363 || 61–70
|- style="background:#fbb"
| 132 || August 29 || Giants || 1–3 || Tom Bradley (12–11) || Ken Brett (12–6) || None || 25,146 || 61–71
|- style="background:#bfb"
| 133 || August 30 || Expos || 8–7 || George Culver (6–4) || Mike Marshall (10–8) || None || 10,220 || 62–71
|- style="background:#fbb"
| 134 || August 31 || Expos || 2–5 || Steve Rogers (6–3) || Jim Lonborg (12–11) || Mike Marshall (26) || 14,171 || 62–72
|-

|- style="background:#fbb"
| 135 || September 1 || Expos || 5–11 || Mike Marshall (11–8) || Wayne Twitchell (13–7) || None || 14,217 || 62–73
|- style="background:#fbb"
| 136 || September 2 || Expos || 0–12 || Mike Torrez (9–11) || Ken Brett (12–7) || None || 10,427 || 62–74
|- style="background:#fbb"
| 137 || September 3 (1) || @ Mets || 0–5 || Jerry Koosman (12–14) || Steve Carlton (11–17) || None || see 2nd game || 62–75
|- style="background:#bfb"
| 138 || September 3 (2) || @ Mets || 6–3 || Dick Ruthven (6–9) || Craig Swan (0–1) || Mac Scarce (10) || 30,748 || 63–75
|- style="background:#fbb"
| 139 || September 4 || @ Mets || 1–7 || Tom Seaver (16–8) || Jim Lonborg (12–12) || None || 13,674 || 63–76
|- style="background:#fbb"
| 140 || September 5 || @ Mets || 0–4 || Ray Sadecki (4–3) || Wayne Twitchell (13–8) || Tug McGraw (16) || 12,563 || 63–77
|- style="background:#fbb"
| 141 || September 7 || Pirates || 8–10 || Bob Johnson (4–1) || Mac Scarce (0–6) || Ramón Hernández (7) || 15,233 || 63–78
|- style="background:#fbb"
| 142 || September 8 || Pirates || 3–5 || Bob Moose (10–11) || Steve Carlton (11–18) || Dave Giusti (17) || 16,320 || 63–79
|- style="background:#bfb"
| 143 || September 9 || Pirates || 8–7 || Mac Scarce (1–6) || Bob Johnson (4–2) || None || 14,356 || 64–79
|- style="background:#bfb"
| 144 || September 11 || Mets || 6–4 || Jim Lonborg (13–12) || Jerry Koosman (12–15) || None || 8,159 || 65–79
|- style="background:#fbb"
| 145 || September 12 || Mets || 2–3 || Jon Matlack (13–15) || Wayne Twitchell (13–9) || Tug McGraw (19) || 8,418 || 65–80
|- style="background:#fbb"
| 146 || September 13 || Mets || 2–4 (12) || Tom Seaver (17–9) || George Culver (6–5) || Tug McGraw (20) || 8,194 || 65–81
|- style="background:#fbb"
| 147 || September 14 || @ Expos || 2–3 || Chuck Taylor (2–0) || Steve Carlton (11–19) || None || 13,458 || 65–82
|- style="background:#fbb"
| 148 || September 15 || @ Expos || 4–5 (10) || Tom Walker (7–5) || Mac Scarce (1–7) || None || 34,331 || 65–83
|- style="background:#fbb"
| 149 || September 16 || @ Expos || 2–4 || Steve Renko (14–10) || Jim Lonborg (13–13) || None || 18,122 || 65–84
|- style="background:#bbb"
| – || September 17 || @ Cubs || colspan=6 | Postponed (rain); Makeup: September 18 as a traditional double-header
|- style="background:#bfb"
| 150 || September 18 (1) || @ Cubs || 5–2 || Barry Lersch (3–6) || Bob Locker (9–6) || Mac Scarce (11) || see 2nd game || 66–84
|- style="background:#fbb"
| 151 || September 18 (2) || @ Cubs || 2–3 || Bill Bonham (6–4) || Ken Brett (12–8) || None || 2,757 || 66–85
|- style="background:#bfb"
| 152 || September 19 || Cardinals || 3–2 || Steve Carlton (12–19) || Tom Murphy (3–7) || None || 7,066 || 67–85
|- style="background:#bfb"
| 153 || September 20 || Cardinals || 6–5 || Bucky Brandon (2–4) || Alan Foster (13–9) || Mac Scarce (12) || 6,155 || 68–85
|- style="background:#fbb"
| 154 || September 21 || Cardinals || 3–12 || Rick Wise (14–12) || Jim Lonborg (13–14) || None || 13,158 || 68–86
|- style="background:#fbb"
| 155 || September 22 || Cubs || 2–5 (10) || Bill Bonham (7–4) || Mac Scarce (1–8) || None || 22,273 || 68–87
|- style="background:#bfb"
| 156 || September 23 || Cubs || 9–7 || Ken Brett (13–8) || Burt Hooton (14–15) || Ron Diorio (1) || 9,991 || 69–87
|- style="background:#bfb"
| 157 || September 25 || @ Pirates || 2–1 || Steve Carlton (13–19) || Jim Rooker (9–6) || None || 13,312 || 70–87
|- style="background:#fbb"
| 158 || September 26 || @ Pirates || 2–13 || Bob Moose (12–12) || Jim Lonborg (13–15) || Bob Johnson (4) || 8,991 || 70–88
|- style="background:#bfb"
| 159 || September 27 || @ Pirates || 3–2 (13) || George Culver (7–5) || Chris Zachary (0–1) || Mike Wallace (1) || 11,577 || 71–88
|- style="background:#fbb"
| 160 || September 28 || @ Cardinals || 0–3 || Diego Seguí (7–6) || Ken Brett (13–9) || None || 10,377 || 71–89
|- style="background:#fbb"
| 161 || September 29 || @ Cardinals || 1–7 || Bob Gibson (12–10) || Steve Carlton (13–20) || Orlando Peña (7) || 16,104 || 71–90
|- style="background:#fbb"
| 162 || September 30 || @ Cardinals || 1–3 || Rick Wise (16–12) || Jim Lonborg' (13–16) || None || 16,108 || 71–91
|-

| style="text-align:left;" |
The July 15, 1973, game was protested by the Phillies in the middle of the sixth inning. The protest was later denied.

 Roster 

 Player stats 

 Batting 

 Starters by position Note: Pos = Position; G = Games played; AB = At bats; H = Hits; Avg. = Batting average; HR = Home runs; RBI = Runs batted in Other batters Note: G = Games played; AB = At bats; H = Hits; Avg. = Batting average; HR = Home runs; RBI = Runs batted in Pitching 

 Starting pitchers Note: G = Games pitched; IP = Innings pitched; W = Wins; L = Losses; ERA = Earned run average; SO = Strikeouts Other pitchers Note: G = Games pitched; IP = Innings pitched; W = Wins; L = Losses; ERA = Earned run average; SO = Strikeouts Relief pitchers Note: G = Games pitched; W = Wins; L = Losses; SV = Saves; ERA = Earned run average; SO = Strikeouts Farm system 

LEAGUE CHAMPIONS: Reading, Spartanburg, Auburn

 Notes 

 References 
1973 Philadelphia Phillies season at Baseball Reference''

Philadelphia Phillies seasons
Philadelphia Phillies season
Philadelph